Lucien Jasseron (29 December 1913, in Oran – 15 November 1999, in Strasbourg) was a French footballer.

He played for Le Havre AC and RC Paris, and was part of France in the 1938 World Cup. He then had a coaching career.

References

 Profile

1913 births
1999 deaths
Footballers from Oran
People of French Algeria
Pieds-Noirs
French footballers
France international footballers
Ligue 1 players
Le Havre AC players
Racing Club de France Football players
1938 FIFA World Cup players
French football managers
Le Havre AC managers
Olympique Lyonnais managers
SC Bastia managers
Association football midfielders
Migrants from French Algeria to France